Ernest Manning High School is a public senior high school located in the City of Calgary, Alberta, Canada, south of the Bow River.  The school falls under the jurisdiction of the Calgary Board of Education.

History
The original Ernest Manning High School was built in 1963, and is named after the eighth Premier of Alberta, Ernest Manning.

The school is part of the Action for Bright Children Society.

New campus
On October 7, 2008, the Calgary Board of Education approved and announced the closure of the existing Ernest Manning High School to facilitate the expansion of the western leg of Calgary's Light Rail Transit. The last class to graduate was in the summer of 2011 before the building was torn down.  The students of Ernest Manning transferred to the new high school located on the western edge of Calgary near the community of Springbank in fall 2011.  The construction of the new high school was completed in September 2011.

Athletics
The Ernest Manning Griffins athletic teams compete in the Calgary Zone of the Alberta Schools Athletic Association.  The school holds membership in the Calgary Senior High School Athletic Association. In 2019 the Jr. Football Team went 8–0, beating traditional powerhouses St. Francis and Notre Dame en route to a City Championship.

Notable alumni
 Doug Black, Canadian senator
 Bret Hart, former professional wrestler
 Owen Hart, former professional wrestler
 Nivek Ogre, lead singer of Skinny Puppy

References

External links

Ernest Manning High School
Calgary Board of Education
Ernest Manning High School alumni

Educational institutions established in 1963
High schools in Calgary
1963 establishments in Alberta